Luisella is a genus of sea slugs, specifically aeolid nudibranchs, marine gastropod molluscs in the family Samlidae.

Species 
Species within the genus Luisella are as follows:
 ''Luisella babai (Schmekel, 1972)

References

Samlidae
Monotypic gastropod genera